Papua New Guinea has 326 local-level governments (LLGs) comprising 6,112 wards as of 2018.

Note: LLG names with slashes (/) are listed with dashes (-) due to technical limitations on previous versions of the Wikipedia software.

Administrative divisions
At the highest level, Papua New Guinea is divided into four regions, namely the Highlands, Islands, Momase, and Southern regions.

Below, Papua New Guinea has 22 province-level divisions: 20 integrated provinces, the autonomous province of North Solomons (Bougainville) and the National Capital District.

Each province has one or more districts, and each district has one or more local-level government (LLG) areas. For census purposes, the LLG areas are subdivided into wards and those into census units.

Wards typically consist of a few hundred to a few thousand individuals, and are the lowest level of government administration under LLGs. Wards are further divided into census units (CU).

List of local-level governments by region and province

Highlands Region

Chimbu Province

Eastern Highlands Province

Enga Province

Southern Highlands Province

Western Highlands Province

Hela Province

Jiwaka Province

Islands Region

East New Britain Province

Manus Province

New Ireland Province

West New Britain Province

Autonomous Region of Bougainville

Momase Region

East Sepik Province

Madang Province

Morobe Province

Sandaun (West Sepik) Province

Southern Region

Central Province

Gulf Province

Milne Bay Province

Oro (Northern) Province

Western (Fly) Province

National Capital District

Demographics and postal codes
The following is a list of local-level government areas sorted by postal code. Postal codes, all prefixed with the country code PG, begin with two-digit provincial codes, followed by two-digit district codes, and finally two-digit LLG codes.

See also 
 Districts of Papua New Guinea
 Provinces of Papua New Guinea
 Regions of Papua New Guinea
 List of cities and towns in Papua New Guinea
 List of cities and towns in Papua New Guinea by population

References

LLG boundary maps by Province (National Research Institute of Papua New Guinea)

External links
National Statistical Office, Papua New Guinea (2011 National Population and Housing Census documents)
Mapping Application with a lot of detail down to the LLG level
Local Level Government listInter Government relations department of PNG
PNG Business Directory
List of District Capitals
Schedule of Polling for 2007 electionPNG Electoral Commission (document contains LLG details)
List of LLGs by Province, with Presidents or Mayors

 
Subdivisions of Papua New Guinea
Papua New Guinea, Local-level governments
Papua New Guinea 3
Local-level governments, Papua New Guinea
Papua New Guinea geography-related lists